Volleyball at the 2015 Pacific Games in Port Moresby, Papua New Guinea was held on July 11–18, 2015. Wallis and Futuna won the gold medal in the men's competition, defeating New Caledonia in the final. In the women's competition, American Samoa won the gold medal by defeating Tahiti in the final.

Medal summary

Medal table

Results

Teams
Eleven men's teams and nine women's teams participated in 2015:

Men's tournament

Pool A
 
 
 
 
 

Pool B

Women's tournament

Pool A
 
 
 
 
 

Pool B

References

 
2015 Pacific Games
Pacific Games
2015